Apriona chemsaki is a species of beetle in the family Cerambycidae. It was described by Hua in 1986. It is known from China.

References

Batocerini
Beetles described in 1986